The 1936 United States elections were held on November 3. The Democratic Party built on their majorities in both chambers of Congress and maintained control of the presidency.

In the presidential election, incumbent Democratic President Franklin D. Roosevelt won re-election, defeating Republican Governor Alf Landon of Kansas. Roosevelt took every state but Vermont and Maine, winning with the fourth largest electoral vote margin in American history. Roosevelt took just under 61 percent of the popular vote, a number that only Lyndon Johnson would surpass (although the popular vote was not officially counted prior to the 1824 election). Landon decisively won his party's nomination over Idaho Senator William Borah.

The Democrats gained twelve seats in the House of Representatives, furthering their supermajority over the Republicans. The Democrats also maintained a supermajority in the Senate, gaining seven seats.

See also
1936 United States presidential election
1936 United States House of Representatives elections
1936 United States Senate elections
1936 United States gubernatorial elections

References

 
1936